Nadine Hanssen (born 7 October 1993) is a Dutch professional footballer who plays as a midfielder for SWPL1 club Aberdeen.

Hanssen was born in the Netherlands and prior to signing for Aston Villa in 2018, she had played for PSV and Utrecht.

Club career

Aston Villa 
Hanssen joined Aston Villa in 2018. Hanssen made her Aston Villa debut on 18 August against Sheffield United in a 2–1 loss in the WSL cup.

Aberdeen 
Hanssen joined Aberdeen Women in 2022. Hanssen scored her debut goal against Glasgow Women FC at Pittodrie.

Career statistics

Club

Notes

Personal life
Hanssen moved to Aberdeen with her partner Kelle Roos. She decided to restart her own football career after the birth of their son Romeo in December 2021.

References

External links 

 Soccerway

1993 births
Living people
Dutch women's footballers
Women's association football midfielders
Aston Villa W.F.C. players
Women's Championship (England) players
Women's Super League players
20th-century Dutch women
21st-century Dutch women
Expatriate women's footballers in England
FC Utrecht (women) players
PSV (women) players
Expatriate women's footballers in Scotland
BeNe League players
Scottish Women's Premier League players
Dutch expatriate sportspeople in England
Dutch expatriate sportspeople in Scotland
Aberdeen F.C. Women players
Association footballers' wives and girlfriends